Stephan Feck (born 17 February 1990 in Leipzig, East Germany) is a German diver who competes in the Men's 1 and 3 metre springboard.

He won the silver medal at the 2010 European Aquatics Championships in Budapest and at the 2011 European Diving Championships in Turin. At the 2012 Summer Olympics, he competed in the Men's 3m Springboard but a calamity occurred after he slipped off the board and landed hard on the water on his back, scoring him zero from the judges. The video of his dive quickly became popular on the internet. 

At the 2016 Summer Olympics, he competed in the men's 3 m springboard where he finished 17th in the semifinal and did not qualify for the final. He also competed in the men's synchronized 3 m springboard with teammate Patrick Hausding. They finished in 4th place.

Feck is trained by Uwe Fischer, the father of Heike Fischer.

References

German male divers
1990 births
Living people
Olympic divers of Germany
Divers at the 2012 Summer Olympics
Divers at the 2016 Summer Olympics
Divers from Leipzig
21st-century German people